The vice-president of the Arab Republic of Egypt is a senior official within the Egyptian government.

History of the office

Before 1971
In 1962, President Gamal Abdel Nasser instituted collective leadership in Egypt, separating the post of Prime Minister from that of President and establishing a presidential council to deal with all issues formerly considered presidential prerogatives. Five of the council's 11 members were Vice-Presidents of Egypt.

Under the 1971 Constitution
According to article 139 of the 1971 Constitution, the President "may appoint one or more Vice-Presidents define their jurisdiction and relieve them of their posts. The rules relating to the calling to account of the President of the Republic shall be applicable to the Vice-Presidents." The Constitution gave broad authority to the President to determine the number of Vice-Presidents, as well as their appointment, dismissal and duties of office.

After the 2011 amendments, the president should appointed a vice president 60 days after his inauguration.

Under the 2012 Constitution
The 2012 Constitution did not include the position of Vice-President.

With the adoption of the 2012 Constitution on 26 December 2012, the office of Vice-President was abolished. Mahmoud Mekki was the last person to hold the office before the adoption of the 2012 Constitution, having resigned on 22 December 2012.

2013 Civilian Uprising
After the overthrow of President Mohamed Morsi in the 2013 Egyptian coup d'état, the position of the Vice-President was briefly restored (with extra-constitutional basic) by Acting President Adly Mansour, who appointed Mohamed ElBaradei to the post of Acting Vice-President on 7 July 2013. He was sworn in on 14 July. On 14 August 2013, following a violent crackdown by security forces on supporters of deposed President Morsi, in which more than 800 people were killed, ElBaradei resigned as Acting Vice President.

Under the 2014 Constitution
Much like the 2012 Constitution, until 2019, the 2014 Constitution also did not include the position of Vice-President.

The office has since been restored following a constitutional referendum.

List of officeholders 

This list contains Vice-Presidents of United Arab Republic (1958–71, included Syria until the 1961 coup d'état) and Arab Republic of Egypt (1971–present).

References

 El-Gawady, Mohamed:Cabinets during period of Revolution (1986)
 Hafez, Salah: Democracy Shock (2001)

External links
 http://nasser.bibalex.org/Days/DaysAll.aspx?CS=1&x=5

 
Egypt